A semiregular space is a topological space whose regular open sets (sets that equal the interiors of their closures) form a base for the topology.

Examples and sufficient conditions

Every regular space is semiregular, and every topological space may be embedded into a semiregular space.

The space  with the double origin topology and the Arens square are examples of spaces that are Hausdorff semiregular, but not regular.

See also

Notes

References

 Lynn Arthur Steen and J. Arthur Seebach, Jr., Counterexamples in Topology. Springer-Verlag, New York, 1978. Reprinted by Dover Publications, New York, 1995.  (Dover edition).
  

Properties of topological spaces
Separation axioms